The Alas people is an indigenous ethnic group from Kutacane, Southeast Aceh district, Sumatra, Indonesia. The Alas are found in the Gunung Leuser, Ketambe, and Alas River areas.

Van Daalen's Alas, Batak and Gayo campaign　
At the final stage of the Aceh War in 1904, Gotfried Coenraad Ernst van Daalen started on his campaign to Gayoland, Alasland, and Batakland in order to establish the Dutch colonial control over them.  After demolishing 7 forts and killing nearly 1300 inhabitants in Gayoland, his Korps Marechaussee te voet appeared in the Alas valley on 10 June 1904.  One local lord (kejukhun) at northern Alasland surrendered immediately, but, as the other local lord of Gayonese descent at southern Alasland had already been killed in Gayoland by Gotfried Coenraad Ernst van Daalen, his son, the acting southern local lord, and a brother of the northern local lord decided to confront the non-Islamic Dutch, building 3 forts or fortified villages.

On 14 June 1904, the Dutch troops demolished the fort of Kuta Reh, killing 313 indigenous men, 189 women, and 59 children, while 2 Dutch soldiers were killed.  On 20 June 1904, then, they demolished the fort of Likat, killing 220 men, 124 women, and 88 children, while a single soldier was killed.  Indeed, the village of Likat was one of Gayonese migrants into the Alas valley. On 24 June 1904, finally, they demolished the fort of Kute Lengat Baru, killing 338 men, 186 women, and 130 children, including the acting southern local lord, while 3 soldiers were killed.  On 29 June 1904, Gotfried Coenraad Ernst van Daalen summoned the northern local lord and the son of the deceased southern local lord with all other Alas chiefs and headmen to the village of Pedesi in front of him, to declare that the whole of Alasland belonged to the Dutch East Indies.

During this campaign, Henricus Marinus Neeb, a military doctor, took many photos, including ones of fighting scenes, marching through the tropical rain forest, local fishing activities, traditional houses, mosques, and so on.

Society 

The Alas (ukhang Alas or kalak Alas) are an agrarian people, who cultivate rice on irrigated fields, but some grow cash crops in gardens.  Freshwater fishing in Alas River or brooks used to be indispensable as a source of animal protein, while raising fish in ponds is becoming important.  Between the 15th and 17th centuries, they converted to Islam,  The Alas society is a patrilineal descent society; each belongs to one exogamous clan.  Sometimes an Alas village (kute) consists of a single clan, while several clans could frequently be observed in one village.  As Alas clan names suggest, the Alas people have composite origins.

Language 

The Alas people uses the Alas language (Cekhok Alas) on a daily basis. The Alas language is most closely related to the language of the Kluet people in Aceh Selatan Regency, and often, these two languages are unified under a single label Alas–Kluet. Together with Karo and Dairi, Alas–Kluet belongs to the northern branch of the Batak subgroup of the Austronesian language family. It is estimated that 80,000 people spoke the language in 2000. Although Alas people live in Aceh Province, the language they use is entirely distinct from Acehnese.

Clans 

Each Alas person belongs to a patrilineal clan or descent group (mekhge).  It has its own name, which is used as surname of the Alas people.  In 1988 there were 27 clans as follows, but some had already had no member.  Out of them, 8 clans, viz. Bangko, Cibekho, Deski, Keling, Kepale Dese, Kekhuas, Pagan, and Selian, are believed to be original among the Alas.

 Bangko
 Deski
 Keling
 Kepale Dese
 Kekhuas
 Pagan
 Selian
 Acih
 Bekhuh
 Gale
 Kekakho
 Mahe
 Menalu
 Mencawan (Bencawan)
 Munte
 Pase
 Pelis
 Pinim
 Ramin
 Ramud
 Sambo
 Sekedang
 Sugihen
 Sepayung
 Tekhigan
 Cibekho
 Sinage

Arts

Alas traditional dances and musical instruments are as follows:

 Mesekat dance
 Pelabat dance
 Landok alun dance
 Tangis dilo
 Canang situ
 Canang buluh
 Genggong
 Oloi-olio
 Keketuk layakh

Crafts

Alas traditional crafts are as follows:
 Nemet (weaving of rumbia leaves)
 Mbayu amak (pandan mat)
 Bordikh (customary attire)
 Pisau bekhemu (Alas traditional sword)
Payung mesikhat (Alas ritual umbrella)

Traditional dishes
Alas traditional dishes are as follows:

 Manuk labakh
 Ikan labakh
 Puket megaukh
 Lepat bekhas
 Gelame
 Puket megaluh
 Buah khum-khum
 Ikan pacik kule
 Telukh mandi
 Puket mekuah
 Tumpi
 Godekhr
 Puket sekuning
 Cimpe
 Getuk

References

Further reading 
 Akifumi Iwabuchi, 1994, The People of the Alas Valley: A Study of an Ethnic Group of Northern Sumatra, Oxford: Clarendon Press, .

See also 
 Alas language
 Payung mesikhat
 Aceh War
 Kuta Reh massacre
 Gotfried Coenraad Ernst van Daalen
 Henricus Marinus Neeb
 Gayo people

Ethnic groups in Indonesia
Ethnic groups in Sumatra
Ethnic groups in Aceh
Muslim communities of Indonesia